Chowara is a small town near Aluva in the Ernakulam district in the state of Kerala, India.

Demographics
At the 2001 India census, Chowwara had a population of 13,603. Males constituted 50% of the population and females 50%. Chowwara had an average literacy rate of 79%, higher than the national average of 59.5%: male literacy was 81% and, female literacy was 76%. In Chowwara, 10% of the population was under 6 years of age.

Chowara is a small town present in the Sreemoolanagaram Panchayat in Aluva of the Ernakulam district in Kerala, India. Located on the River Periyar, Cochin International Airport Limited – CIAL at Nedumbassery, is 6.3 km away from Chowara. It’s accessibility through Rail (Chowara Railway Station), Air (CIAL Airport) and Water (Chowara Ferry).

Politics
Chowara is in the constituency of Aluva Kerala Legislative Assembly.Chowara is part of the Chalakudy (Lok Sabha constituency). Anwar Sadath is the MLA of Chowara constituency of Aluva. It is part of Chalakudy (Lok Sabha constituency).

Travel 
Chowara is well connected by air, road and rail from all parts of the State.

By Air 
Cochin International Airport is just 6.3 km from the town center. Regular domestic and international connections are available from the airport.

By Train 
Chowara railway station (IR Code: CWR) in the town, The Chowara Railway Station is close to Aluva Railway Station, a major railway station in Kerala

By Bus 
Mainly private buses are here. KSRTC buses servicing from Aluva to Angamaly, Kalady Via Chowara-Mahilalayam bridge.

By Ferry 
Chowara Ferry is the easiest way to traveling Marambally, Perumbavoor side.

By car
Taxis – Taxis and Uber are available

Rented Vehicles – There are many places where you can rent Cars and Bikes.

Location

References

Cities and towns in Ernakulam district
Suburbs of Kochi